The Golden Eagle Award for Best Leading Actor is one of twenty award categories presented annually by the National Academy of Motion Pictures Arts and Sciences of Russia. It is one of the Golden Eagle Awards, which were conceived by Nikita Mikhalkov as a counterweight to the Nika Award established in 1987 by the Russian Academy of Cinema Arts and Sciences.

Each year the members of the academy choose three leading actors and the film as a perception. The first actor to be awarded was Viktor Bychkov for the film The Cuckoo. The most recent award was made to Yuri Borisov for AK-47.  Yevgeny Mironov, Sergei Garmash, Nikita Mikhalkov, Konstantin Khabensky, Vladimir Mashkov, and Fyodor Bondarchuk are the most successful artists, winning twice each. Other noteworthy actors who were nominated at least twice are Aleksei Petrenko, Danila Kozlovsky, Bohdan Stupka, Viktor Sukhorukov, Aleksandr Baluev, Yevgeny Tsyganov, Sergei Makovetsky, Sergei Puskepalis, Aleksei Serebryakov, Maksim Matveyev, and Alexander Petrov.

Nomineess and Awardees
Key

Notes

Gallery

References

External links
 

Actor
Lists of films by award
Film awards for lead actor